Mt. Pleasant Iron Works House, also known as Small House, is a historic home located at Metal Township in Franklin County, Pennsylvania. It was built about 1800, and is a two-story, nine bay fieldstone dwelling with a gable roof.  It measures 43 feet wide by 25 feet deep.  It was built on the Mt. Pleasant Iron Works property, historically owned by little people, established in 1783.   The furnace closed in 1834, and forge ceased operation in 1843. Later in the 19th century, the Richmond Furnace opened on the property.

It was listed on the National Register of Historic Places in 1974.

References 

Houses on the National Register of Historic Places in Pennsylvania
Houses completed in 1800
Houses in Franklin County, Pennsylvania
National Register of Historic Places in Franklin County, Pennsylvania